Al Conover (born 1938) is a former American football player and coach. Most notably, he served as head coach at Rice University from 1972 to 1975, compiling a record of 15–27–2 in four seasons before resigning to enter private business.

A native of Largo, Florida, Conover attended Largo High School, where he starred on the football squad and earned an athletic scholarship to Wake Forest University. He spent four years on the Demon Deacon squad, protecting quarterback Norm Snead as tackle under coaches Paul Amen and Billy Hildebrand. Returning to Largo after graduation, he served as his alma mater's head swimming coach and assistant football mentor.

In 1963, he was hired as a graduate assistant by Florida State University head coach Bill Peterson, and later became offensive line coach. After helping the Seminoles to a Gator Bowl appearance in 1967, Conover was hired by Y C McNease at Idaho. When Peterson moved on to Rice University in 1971, he hired Conover as offensive coordinator. Peterson left for the Houston Oilers one season later, and Conover was selected as his successor.

In his first year as Rice head coach, he guided the Owls to a 5–5–1 record, the program's best since 1963. Known for his flamboyance, he brought a coffin onto the practice field to "bury" the Owls' mistakes during the 1973 season. Following a 3–8 season in 1975, Conover resigned to enter private business.

Head coaching record

† 3–8 in 1975 and 15–27–2 overall per NCAA due to forfeit win over Mississippi State.

References

1938 births
Living people
American football offensive tackles
Florida State Seminoles football coaches
Idaho Vandals football coaches
Rice Owls football coaches
Wake Forest Demon Deacons football players
People from Largo, Florida
Coaches of American football from Florida
Players of American football from Florida